Loren Morón may refer to:
 Loren Morón (footballer, born 1970), Spanish football manager and former defender
 Loren Morón (footballer, born 1993), Spanish football striker